Cyrtonus is a genus of leaf beetles in the subfamily Chrysomelinae.

Species 
The genus contains the following species:

 Cyrtonus almeriensis Cobos, 1953
 Cyrtonus angusticollis Fairmaire, 1851
 Cyrtonus arcasi Fairmaire, 1884
 Cyrtonus brevis Fairmaire, 1851
 Cyrtonus canalisternus Marseul, 1883
 Cyrtonus contractus Fairmaire, 1882
 Cyrtonus cupreovirens Perez Arcas, 1872
 Cyrtonus curtulus Fairmaire, 1883
 Cyrtonus curtus Fairmaire, 1851
 Cyrtonus cylindricus Marseul, 1883
 Cyrtonus dufouri Dufour, 1847
 Cyrtonus ehlersi Fairmaire, 1884
 Cyrtonus elegans (Germar, 1813)
 Cyrtonus eumolpus Fairmaire, 1851
 Cyrtonus fairmairei Rosenhauer, 1856
 Cyrtonus franzi Cobos, 1954
 Cyrtonus gadorensis Cobos, 1954
 Cyrtonus gibbicollis Fairmaire, 1866
 Cyrtonus heydeni Fairmaire, 1884
 Cyrtonus majoricensis Breit, 1908
 Cyrtonus martorellii Fairmaire, 1880
 Cyrtonus minor Fairmaire, 1883
 Cyrtonus montanus Fairmaire, 1851
 Cyrtonus oomorphus Fairmaire, 1882
 Cyrtonus plumbeus Fairmaire, 1851
 Cyrtonus puncticeps Fairmaire, 1882
 Cyrtonus punctipennis Fairmaire, 1857
 Cyrtonus punctulatus Fairmaire, 1883
 Cyrtonus riffensis Cobos, 1954
 Cyrtonus rotundatus (Herrich-Schäffer, 1838)
 Cyrtonus ruficornis Fairmaire, 1851
 Cyrtonus scutellatus Fairmaire, 1883
 Cyrtonus strictus Fairmaire, 1883
 Cyrtonus thoracicus Fairmaire, 1851
 Cyrtonus versicolor Marseul, 1883

The following species are considered to be nomina dubia:
 Cyrtonus denticulatus Chevrolat, 1872
 Cyrtonus dorsolineatus Fairmaire, 1883
 Cyrtonus mateui Cobos, 1954
 Cyrtonus pardoi Cobos, 1953
 Cyrtonus sycophanta Fairmaire, 1883

References

External links 

 

Chrysomelinae
Chrysomelidae genera
Taxa named by Pierre André Latreille